Five people have served as Prime Minister of Mauritius since the office was established in 1968, when independence from the United Kingdom was proclaimed. Additionally, one person has served as Chief Minister of Mauritius, the preceding office which existed from 1961 to 1968, while Mauritius still was a British crown colony.

List of officeholders
Political parties

Chief Minister of Mauritius

Prime Ministers of Mauritius

List of prime ministers by length of tenure

See also
 Prime Minister of Mauritius
 Spouse of the prime minister of Mauritius
 List of heads of state of Mauritius
 President of Mauritius
 Governor of Mauritius

References

Mauritius
Government of Mauritius
Mauritian politicians
Lists of political office-holders in Mauritius
Politics of Mauritius

fr:Premiers ministres de Maurice